Lee Kunzman (born November 29, 1944, Guttenberg, Iowa), is a former driver in the USAC and CART Championship Car series. He raced in the 1969, 1972–1973 and 1975-1980 seasons, with 48 combined career starts, including the 1971-1973, 1977 and 1979 Indianapolis 500. He finished in the top ten 21 times, with his best finish in 2nd position in 1979 at Atlanta.

Early in his career, he was the 1967 IMCA sprint car Rookie of the Year. Injuries limited his driving in 1970-71 and 1973-74. After completing his driving career, he became the general manager for Hemelgarn Racing and was part of the winning Indy 500 team with Buddy Lazier in 1996.

Career award
Kunzman was inducted in the National Sprint Car Hall of Fame in 2006.

Indianapolis 500 results

Notes

External links
Driver Database Profile
RACER: Robin Miller's Toughest Drivers Series - Lee Kunzman

1944 births
American racing drivers
Champ Car drivers
Indianapolis 500 drivers
Living people
National Sprint Car Hall of Fame inductees
People from Guttenberg, Iowa
Racing drivers from Iowa
USAC Silver Crown Series drivers